Shelby Rogers was the defending champion, having won the event in 2013, but chose not to participate.

Anna Tatishvili won the all-American final, defeating Irina Falconi 6–2, 6–4.

Seeds

Main draw

Finals

Top half

Bottom half

References 
 Main draw

Coleman Vision Tennis Championships - Singles
Coleman Vision Tennis Championships
2014 Coleman Vision Tennis Championships